Ann Verhelst (born 29 December 1959), known professionally as Ann Demeulemeester, is a Belgian fashion designer whose label, Ann Demeulemeester, is mainly showcased at the annual Paris Fashion Week. She is known as one of the Antwerp Six in the fashion industry.

Early life
Ann Verhelst was born in Kortrijk in 1959 to Albert and Monique Verhelst-Pappijn, and later lived in the city of Bruges. The reason why she made the decision to change her real name "Verhelst" to "Demeulemeester" remains unknown. Initially, Verhelst showed no interest in fashion. She attended art school for three years, where she discovered her fascination with people and portraiture, which led her to begin thinking about clothing design. From this, she went on to study fashion design at the Royal Academy of Fine Arts in Antwerp from 1978 to 1981. In 1986, Verhelst, along with fellow graduates from the Antwerp Royal Academy, decided to showcase her collection in London. Though, as she was pregnant at the time and unable to make the trip to London, she only displayed a selection of sunglasses. This group of Belgian designers will soon be known as the 'Antwerp Six', a radical and distinctive Belgian group of designers of the 1980s to whom Verhelst has been associated, almost by mistake, but will forever be linked to. This group of avant-garde designers are known for their deconstructivist styles of creating untraditional clothing lines. Other notables from the group include Dries van Noten and Walter Van Beirendonck.

Career

Late beginnings 
Verhelst graduated from the Royal Academy of Fine Arts in 1981,. A year after her graduation, she won the Gouden Spoel, a Belgian awarded prize to the year's most promising fashion designer, though the impact of the award in the industry was very limited. Verhelst struggled to find a first job and began working as a freelance pattern maker, assisting fashion icon Martin Margiela 
, for an undisclosed Italian coat brand for a few years.

Ann Demeulemeester
In 1985, Verhelst finally launched her own brand, Ann Demeulemeester-Verhelst, in collaboration with her husband, Patrick Robyn, who put an end to a burgeoning career as a photographer to devote himself to his wife's fashion label, assuming the role of a shadow creative director for the brand, an unofficial position that he has still been occupying to this days. In 1996, she debuted her own menswear line.

She opened her first store in Antwerp in 1999.

Verhelst worked with the artist Jim Dine, and draws inspiration from singer Patti Smith. She worked on a clothing line inspired by Jackson Pollock.

In June 2013, her parent company 32 BVBA, which also housed designer Haider Ackermann, split into independent brands. In November 2013, Verhelst announced she was leaving the fashion house. The exit letter also explained that the brand will show its autumn/winter 2014 men's and women's collection together at February's Paris Fashion Week. Following her departure, Ann Verhelst choose herself the French designer Sébastien Meunier as her successor as artistic director of the brand. Sébastien Meunier had previously worked for 10 years with the  Belgian fashion genius Martin Margiela before joining Ann Demeulemeester in 2010, officially for designing the house's men's collections while in reality being trained by Ann Verhelst and Patrick Robyn themselves to his future position of artistic director.

The Demeulemeester label "operates freestanding stores in Antwerp, Hong Kong and Tokyo, and wholesales to an array of international retailers including Saks Fifth Avenue and Barneys New York in America, L’Eclaireur and Le Bon Marché in Paris and Lane Crawford and Joyce in Hong Kong."

Ann Demeulemeester Serax
After leaving fashion, Verhelst attended porcelain master classes in England and France. In 2019, she launched Ann Demeulemeester Serax in collaboration with Belgian diffusion label Serax, a collection of affordable porcelain dinner services hand-painted in China, but also silverware, glasses and larger houseware, following the path of other famous fashion designers of the like of Inès de la Fressange, José Levy or Christian Lacroix

Antonioli
After the Italian retailer Claudio Antonioli bought the company in 2020  and after the resignation of Sébastien Meunier, Ann Verhelst announced, in September 2021, her return to the Ann Demeulemeester label, therefore forever linking her name and legacy to Claudio Antonioli, whose name is mainly associated with the rise of luxury streetwear. That same month, the brand's Antwerp flagship store reopened after a year of renovation, drawing back to the minimalist aesthetic, originally conceived by the famed Belgian architects duo Robbrecht en Daem, the store itself now being mostly focused on the Ann Demeulemeester Serax homeware and furnitures collections rather than on the fashion collections, confirming the brand's smart transition from a "Fashion House" to a "Lifestyle Brand". In the meantime, Belgian national newspaper De Tijd revealed that 42 out of the 48 Antwerp-based employees of Ann Demeulemeester had been dismissed, despite most of them have been working for the label for over 3 decades and were hired by Ann Verhelst herself. The article also revealed that the company itself was relocated to Milan, definitively cutting the fashion house from its historical Flemish roots. In an exclusive interview granted to journalist Jesse Brouns, Ann Verhelst, Patrick Robyn and Claudio Antonioli confirmed the relocation of the Belgian brand to Italy, the later stating that "Milan [compared to Antwerp] is a fashion city. That made recruiting a new team of 25 people easier."

Claudio Antonioli enrolled designer Nina Maria Nitsche as “ghost” creative director of the brand, another Maison Margiela alumni, after her short and unfortunate stances at both Vetements and Kering’s own Brioni. At the same time,  Antonioli also named Francesco Francavilla, a former  Dolce & Gabbana and Rene Caovilla executive as Global Marketing and Communications Director, as well as naming Tobia Beretta, who previously worked as Commercial Manager of Neil Barrett for 3 years to the position of CEO of Ann Demeulemeester.

In order to remain faithful to the Demeulemeester DNA, Claudio Antonioli kept the 1944 born, Parisian PR legend, Michelle Montagne at the helm of the company's press relations.

The brand's first fashion show under Antonioli era, which took place in October 2021 in Paris and relied mostly on denim and archives replicas, received mixed reviews from the international press.

As for the second outing of Claudio Antonioli for the brand, in March 2022, Vogue described it, in a notably harsh review,  as if «The models all looked like they were heading to a meeting with their bank managers to declare themselves bankrupt».

For Sanremo Music Festival 2022, Ann Demeulemeester dressed  Italian musician Mahmood, who joins the list of the brand's legends alongside Patti Smith and P.J. Harvey.

Personal life

Verhelst married photographer Patrick Robyn in 1985. The couple used to live in the outskirts of Antwerp in the famous Maison Guiette, the only house in Belgium designed by Le Corbusier. Ann Verhelst has since moved to Kesselhof manor, a 19th-century Italian rococo revival villa situated in the village of Kessel, that she bought from Baroness Diane Caroline Van Zuylen Van Nyevelt, whose family made its wealth in the Belgian Congo.

Awards
 1982 Golden Spindle Award, Belgium

See also
 Antwerp Six
 List of fashion designers

References

External links

 
 
 

1959 births
Living people
Belgian fashion designers
Belgian women fashion designers
High fashion brands
Royal Academy of Fine Arts (Antwerp) alumni
People from Waregem
Clothing brands of Belgium